The 2017–18 FC Basel season was the 125th season in club history and the club's 23rd consecutive season in the top flight of Swiss football. Basel were the reigning Swiss Super League champions. The season started on the weekend of 22–23 July 2017 and ended on 19 May 2018. They were also the Swiss Cup holders. The first round of the Swiss Cup was played on 13 August 2017. Basel were also qualified for this season's Champions League in the Group stage. The first round was played on 12 September 2017.

Club

Management 
Raphaël Wicky was appointed as new first team manager and was given a two-year contract with an option for a third year. His assistant is Massimo Lombardo and further members of the training staff are Werner Leuthard and Marco Walker. Massimo Colomba is the Goalkeeper coach. Massimo Ceccaroni is head of the FCB Youth System.

Further information 

The FC Basel annual general meeting took place on 9 June 2017. The previous board of directors under president Bernhard Heusler with sportdirector Georg Heitz, vice-president Adrian Knup, financial manager Stephan Werthmüller and marketing manager René Kamm stepped back. Reto Baumgartner, Dominik Donzé and Benno Kaiser remained on the board. Bernhard Burgener took over as chairman and Marco Streller as sportdirector.
 Peter von Büren was voted as financial manager and Patrick Jost in marketing.

Overview

Offseason and preseason
At the end of the 2016–17 FC Basel season Marc Janko left the club and joined Czech First League club Sparta Prague. Daniel Høegh also left the club and joined SC Heerenveen of the Dutch Eredivisie On 23 June 2017 Basel announced that Jean-Paul Boëtius had been transferred to Dutch club Feyenoord. Seydou Doumbia's loan came to an end and Basel neither wanted to prolong nor enter the option to buy him. Adama Traoré left the club mid-August because he no longer played a part in the teams planning.

In the other direction Basel were not too busy on the transfer market. On 14 June 2017 Basel announced that they had signed Ricky van Wolfswinkel from SBV Vitesse. A few days later, on 20 June, the club announced that they had loaned Dimitri Oberlin from Red Bull Salzburg.

First half of season
During the season, on 13 September 2017 Basel announced that they had recalled striker Cedric Itten from the loan to Luzern. Then following the injury suffered by Ricky van Wolfswinkel Basel were forced to hire another striker and on 2 October 2017 they announced that Albian Ajeti had been signed a five-year contract.

Mid-season break
During the winter mid-season break there was also quite some movements on the transfer market. On 23 December 2017 FC Basel announced that Fabian Frei would return to the club, signing a four and a half year contract dated up until June 2022. On 27 December the club announced that Samuele Campo, a former Basel youth player, was also returning, signing a four and a half year contract dated up until June 2022. Furthermore, on 10 January 2018 the club announced that another former Basel player Valentin Stocker was also returning. Stocker signed a three and a half year contract dated up until June 2021.

In the other direction, also on 10 January, Basel announced that Renato Steffen had left the club. Steffen signed a three and a half year deal with VfL Wolfsburg. The transfer fee was reported as being 1.75 million Euro. Just a few days later Basel announced that Akanji had transferred to Borussia Dortmund. The transfer fee was reported as being 21.5 million Euro. He signed a four and a half year contract dated until June 2022.

The Campaign

Domestic League
The season started on the weekend of 22–23 July 2017. Basel's priority aim for the new season is to win the league championship for the ninth consecutive time. Their first game was the match against Young Boys in Stade de Suisse which ended in a 0–2 defeat. Following three victories Basel played four games without a win (two draws, two defeats) and slipped down to fourth position in the league table. Following this poor start the following game was at home against Zürich. The game was a passionate battle and the home club titled their report: A passionately fighting FCB wins against FCZ 1:0. The game changed the run of the season and afterwards the team won seven and drawing three of the next ten games. The first game of the second half of the season was the last game of the kalender year and is included in these figures. By the mid-season break Basel had narrowed the gap to table leaders Young Boys to just two points, third placed Zürich were twelve points adrift.

After the winter break Basel could not find to their good form that they had before the break. They lost three of their first four games, at home against Lugano and St. Gallen and away against Luzern. The gap to leading Young Boys grew and was no longer reversible. The 5–1 win against Young Boys was achieved in the third last game of the season, but came after the championship had mathematically already been decided.

Domestic Cup
Basel are the Swiss Cup holders. Basel's clear aim for the cup is to defend their title. The first round of the Swiss Cup started on 13 August 2017. In the first three rounds Basel were drawn away against lower-tier teams, winning against FC Wettswil-Bonstetten, FC Chiasso and FC Rapperswil-Jona. Basel were then drawn at home against Luzern in the quarter-final. This was won 2–1 and Basel advance to the semi-final in the Stade de Suisse against Young Boys on 27 February 2018.

Champions League
Basel entered into this season's Champions League in the Group stage. They were drawn into Group A along with Manchester United, Benfica and CSKA Moscow. Basels initial aim is to remain in a European competition after the Champions League group stage. The first match was the away game against Manchester United. Basel were previously drawn with both Benfica and United in 2011–12 and on this occasion, United finished third in the group and dropped down to the UEFA Europa League.

Manchester United (12 September 2017)
The first game was played in Old Trafford, in proper Manchester weather in Manchester. Basel were sitting deep, with their three centre-backs, as United took control of the game from the very start. Marouane Fellaini came off the bench after 19 minutes to replace the injured Paul Pogba and opened the scoring with a powerful header in the 35 minute, which was only part of his Man of the Match performance. Basel played better after the opening goal and even at the beginning of the second half created their chances. But it was also a particularly special night for Romelu Lukaku and Marcus Rashford, both of whom found the net on their Champions League debuts with second-half strikes. United took a corner short, Daley Blind to Juan Mata and when Blind took the return he crossed for Lukaku who outjumped Balanta to power home. in the 85 minute Fellaini crossed, the ball was missed by Mkhitaryan and Suchý before Rashford, opening his body, sidefooted into the ground and high into the net.

Benfica (27 September 2017)
Basel ran out 5–0 victors at St. Jakob-Park in Basel against Portuguese side Benfica on Wednesday 27 September in an emphatic and much-needed victory for the Swiss club in the Champions League. Basel controlled the game from the start, Michael Lang (2) and Dimitri Oberlin (20) gave Basel a two-goal lead in the first half. Oberlin showed his amazing speed as he scored this goal. He made a clearance from a Benfica corner before covering the length of the pitch in mere seconds. Impressively, the 20-year-old composed himself after the run upon receiving the pass from Renato Steffen before sending the ball past the goalkeeper Júlio César. Ricky van Wolfswinkel then added a third in the second half (60) with a penalty, before birthday-boy Oberlin scored his second (69) and Blas Riveros's goal in the 76 minute completed the rout. Benfica were reduced to 10-men when André Almeida was sent off for foul play in the 63 minute.

CSKA Moscow (18 October 2017)
Match three of the Group Stage took Basel to the away game in the VEB Arena against CSKA Moscow. The game started slowly, the teams getting to know each other, indeed both teams looked very cautious in the beginning. But Basel took control after about ten minutes. Taulant Xhaka missed his first chance, but in the 29 minute he scored his first European goal in his 47th European match. The Albanian international cruised through the CSKA defence and shot the ball into the back of the net, a right footed shot from outside the box to the bottom left corner. There was little reaction from CSKA players after conceding. Quite the contrary – the visitors grew in confidence and took more control. At the end of an energetic first half, the visitors had the majority of the possession. The hosts matched the energy of the Swiss side, but had not been able to make more than one attempt on goal (off target). It was a deserved lead at half-time and Basel looked the more dangerous in the second half. Ten minutes into the second half the assistant referee canceled out Basel's second goal for offside, after referee Björn Kuipers initially pointed to the centre circle. The decision came about 40 seconds after the visitors started their celebrations. Towards the end of the game Basel made themselves good chances. Dimitri Oberlin missed the target on two occasions, until eventually in the 90 minute he didn't miss. The Switzerland U21 international made his run from the halfway line and finished with composure, slotting it calmly in the corner of goal.

Players

First team squad 
The following is the list of the Basel first team squad. It also includes players that were in the squad the day the season started on 22 July 2017 but subsequently left the club after that date.

Loans

In on loan

Out on loan

Transfers summer 2017

In

Out

Transfers winter 2017–18

In

Out

Results and fixtures 
Kickoff times are in CET

Legend

Friendly matches

Pre- and mid-season

Winter break

Swiss Super League

First half of season

Second half of season

League table

Swiss Cup 

The draw for the first round was held on 28 June 2017. The Super- and Challenge League clubs were seeded and could not be drawn against each other. The lower division teams were granted home advantage and Basel were therefore drawn away. The home advantage was also granted to the team from the lower league in the second and third rounds.

UEFA Champions League

Group stage 

Basel were qualified for the 2017–18 UEFA Champions League in the Group stage. The draw was held on 24 August 2017, at the Grimaldi Forum in Monaco. Basel were drawn into Group A along with Manchester United, Benfica and CSKA Moscow. The first match was the away game against Manchester United.

Matches

Group table

Knockout phase

Round of 16

See also
 History of FC Basel
 List of FC Basel players
 List of FC Basel seasons

References

Sources
 Rotblau: Jahrbuch Saison 2017/2018. Publisher: FC Basel Marketing AG. 
 Die ersten 125 Jahre / 2018. Publisher: Josef Zindel im Friedrich Reinhardt Verlag, Basel. 
 Season 2017–18 at "Basler Fussballarchiv” homepage
 Switzerland 2017–18 at RSSSF

External links
 

Basel
Basel
FC Basel seasons